Cuckoo's egg may refer to:

 Cuckoo's egg (metaphor), a metaphor for brood parasitism including references to spycraft and malware
 Cookoo's Egg, a cryptographic puzzle
 Cuckoo's Egg (book), a 1985 science fiction novel by American writer C. J. Cherryh
 The Cuckoo's Egg (book), a 1989 book by Clifford Stoll

See also
 Cuckoo's nest (disambiguation)